Geologists from the Florida Department of Environmental Protection claim that the U.S. state of Florida may have the largest convergence of freshwater springs on the planet, with over 700.  Hydrological springs are naturally occurring places where water flows from the aquifer (underground) to the surface. There are springs located within 21 Florida State Parks.

In the 1800s, the crystal clear water attracted development; 14 Florida cities have "Spring" in their name.  Spring names have been duplicated in different parts of the state, such as Gator and Salt; Blue Spring was so common that the county name was added to differentiate between the seven locations.

The first comprehensive study of Florida's springs was published in 1947. The next update was released 30 years later in the Florida Geological Survey Bulletin No. 31, Revised, "Springs of Florida". 
In the 1977 Rosenau survey, there were sixteen offshore (under water) springs identified. All but two were situated on the Gulf coast. Since that time, scores of additional springs have been located and are being studied.  The most recent compendium of spring data is contained in the 2004 publication, 
Florida Geological Survey Bulletin 66, and identified 720 springs, of which 33 were first magnitude, 191 were second magnitude, and 151 were third magnitude. Springs are identified by type: river rise (RR) is where a river emerges after flowing underground for a distance; a single spring (SS) has one underground source, but may flow through multiple rock fissures; a group spring (GS) has multiple underground sources; a sink (SK) is an opening in the Earth's surface that occurs from karst processes and/or suffosion.

Volume values listed are the most recent found, mostly after 2000, but water outflows have diminished significantly since the 1990s with drought conditions and increased pumping from the Floridan aquifer.  Water flow diminished and stopped completely at several locations, including White Springs and Worthington Springs, where tourists flocked to drink and soak in the mineral water beginning in the late 1800s. The public water plant at Boulware Springs provided water for the city of Gainesville, Florida and the University of Florida until 1913, when reduced outflow required a new water source.

Many of the springs listed herein are indicated as privately owned, which is a misnomer. "Private individuals cannot 'own' a spring that is along/accessible from a navigable waterway. They own the land around it above the normal high water mark."  
Since the 1972 Clean Water Act (CWA) defined the term "navigable waters", the meaning has been litigated. Following U.S. Supreme Court rulings, the Federal Register published EPA's final definition on November 26, 2008. Section (3) states: "intrastate lakes, rivers, and streams which are utilized by interstate travelers for recreational or other purposes (are navigable waters). Courts have ruled that "shallow streams that are traversable only by canoe have met the test".

Note: The table of contents only applies when the list is sorted by spring name. 
"Mag" refers to the daily magnitude of water flow. 
"Type" denotes RR-River Rise; SS-Single Spring; GS-Group Spring; SK-Sink.
"Daily flow in millions" is the volume of daily water outflow in millions of gallons/litres. 
"Temp" is water temperature in degrees Fahrenheit/Celsius.
"Own" shows ownership of surrounding property: S/tate; F/ederal; P/rivate; C/ounty
Left mouse click on the up/down arrows to sort the list by that column.

See also

List of rivers in Florida
Outstanding Florida Waters

References

External links
Florida's Springs; protecting natures gems
Florida Springs by Underwater Florida
Florida's Springs
Florida Spring descriptions
Florida Geological Survey Bulletin 66
Florida Geological Survey Bulletin 31

 
Springs
Florida
Springs in Florida